The Grote Kerk or Onze-Lieve-Vrouwekerk (Church of Our Lady) is the most important monument and a landmark of Breda. The church is built in the Brabantine Gothic style. The tower of the church is 97 meters tall. The plan is in the shape of a Latin Cross.

History 
The first notice of a stone church in Breda is from 1269. In 1410, the construction of the church started with the choir. In 1468, the church was ready but in 1457 the old tower collapsed and between 1468 and 1509 the current tower was built. They continued building until 1547 when the church was finished in its current shape.

In 1566, the Reformation took place and the church was no longer Catholic. In 1637, the church became Protestant.

The tower spire burned in 1694 and the current spire was built in 1702. From 1843 onwards many restorations took place, the last big restoration took place from 1993 until 1998.

The organ in the Grote Kerk of Breda is one of the largest organs in the Netherlands and its history goes back to the 16th century. At that time, the organ only possessed 16 stops. After being displaced several times, the organ arrived at its present location in the church in 1712. After restoration of the church between 1904 and 1956, a new organ was ordered from D.A. Flentrop in Zaandam. In 1969, the new organ was inaugurated.

Nowadays the church also serves as an event hall. Throughout the year there are hundreds of different events being held at the church. With room for 1000 people and in the center of the city, this is an ideal event location. Some of the events are annually recurring and some are just held once. As an example, in 2019 there was a foodtruck festival held inside the church and also a lot of fairs.

Prince chapel 
The Prinsenkapel (Prince chapel) north of the choir is the old mausoleum of the van Nassau-Dillenburg dynasty, ancestors to the Dutch Royal Family, the House of Orange-Nassau. The chapel was built from 1520 until 1525 on orders of the Lord of Breda, Henry III of Nassau-Breda.  Seventeen family members are buried in the chapel.

When William of Orange died the plan was to bury him also in the chapel, but Breda was at that time occupied by the Spanish. William of Orange and most of his descendants were buried in the mausoleum in the New Church in Delft.

Vault paintings
A special part of the chapel are the vault paintings from 1533. The frescos are made by the Italian painter Tommaso di Andrea Vincidor (a student of Raphael).

Restoration
The restoration of the chapel took five years. In 2003 the chapel was reopened to the public. The vault paintings were completely restored, all adaptations from later periods were removed and the original painting restored.

Gallery

See also
 List of tallest structures built before the 20th century

References

External links

 Website of the Grote Kerk

Towers in North Brabant
Churches in North Brabant
Rijksmonuments in North Brabant
Buildings and structures in Breda
History of Breda
Burial sites of the House of Chalon